The Night of the Medici (German:Die Nacht der Medici) is a 1922 German silent film directed by Karl Grune.

Cast
 Werner Krauss 
 Alfred Abel
 Albert Steinrück

References

Bibliography
 James Robert Parish & Kingsley Canham. Film Directors Guide: Western Europe. Scarecrow Press, 1976.

External links

1922 films
Films of the Weimar Republic
Films directed by Karl Grune
German silent feature films
German black-and-white films